Cardipeltis is an extinct genus of heterostracan agnathan from marine strata of early Devonian of Utah, and Wyoming.  Species of Cardipeltis superficially resemble those of cyathaspids in having a flattened body and indistinct head covered by a large, broad, guitar pick or heart-shaped dorsal shield, and a long, scaly tail.  Unlike cyathaspids, which all have a single ventral plate, however, the ventral shield of Cardipeltis is a mosaic composed of large scales.

References 

Heterostraci genera
Devonian jawless fish
Devonian fish of North America
Taxa named by Maurice Mehl